The Biel/Bienne trolleybus system is part of the public transport network of the bilingual city of Biel/Bienne, in the canton of Bern, Switzerland.  The system also serves the neighbouring municipality of Nidau.

Opened on 19 October 1940, the system gradually replaced the Biel/Bienne tramway network.

Lines 
The present system is made up of the following lines:

Fleet

See also

List of trolleybus systems in Switzerland

References

External links

 Trolleybus city : Biel/Bienne on www.trolleymotion.com 

Transport in Biel/Bienne
Biel Bienne
Biel Bienne
1940 establishments in Switzerland